The British Swimming Championships - 5,000 metres freestyle winners are listed below.

The event was short-lived, ending after 2007 and is currently discontinued.

5,000 metres freestyle champions

See also
British Swimming
List of British Swimming Championships champions

References

Swimming in the United Kingdom